Cladrastis kentukea, the Kentucky yellowwood or American yellowwood (syn. C. lutea, C. tinctoria), is a species of Cladrastis native to the Southeastern United States, with a restricted range from western North Carolina west to eastern Oklahoma, and from southern Missouri and Indiana south to central Alabama. The tree is sometimes also called Virgilia.

Description

The leaves are compound pinnate, 20–30 cm long, with 5-11 (mostly 7-9) alternately arranged leaflets; each leaflet broad ovate with an acute apex; 6–13 cm long and 3–7 cm broad, with an entire margin and a thinly to densely hairy underside. In the fall, the leaves turn a mix of yellow, gold, and orange.

The flowers are fragrant, white, produced in Wisteria-like racemes 15–30 cm long. Flowering is in early summer (June in its native region), and is variable from year to year, with heavy flowering every second or third year. The fruit is a pod 5–8 cm long, containing 2-6 seeds.

 Bark: Smooth gray, or light brown.  Branchlets at first downy, but soon become smooth, light yellowish green; later red brown, finally dark brown.
 Wood: Yellow to pale brown; heavy, hard, close-grained and strong.  Sp. gr., 0.6278; weight of cu. ft., 39.12 lbs.
 Winter buds: Four in a group, making a tiny cone and enclosed in the hollow base of the petiole.
 Leaves: Alternate, pinnately compound, eight to twelve inches long, main stem stout, enlarged at base.  Leaflets seven to eleven, broadly oval, three to four inches long.  Wedge-shaped at base, entire, acute, terminal leaflets rhomboid-ovate.  Feather-veined, midrib and primary veins prominent, grooved above, light yellow beneath.  They come out the bud pale green, downy; when full grown are dark green above, pale beneath.  In autumn they turn a bright clear yellow.
 Flowers: June.  Perfect, papilionaceous, white, borne in drooping terminal panicles twelve to fourteen inches long, five to six inches broad, slightly fragrant.
 Calyx: Campanulate, five-lobed, enlarged on the upper side.
 Corolla: Papilionaceous; standard broad, white, marked on the inner surface with a pale yellow blotch; wings oblong; keel petals free.
 Stamens: Ten, free; filaments thread-like.
 Pistil: Ovary superior, linear, bright red, hairy, bearing a long incurved style.
 Fruit: Legume, smooth, linear-compressed, tipped with the remnants of the styles.  Seeds four to six, dark brown.

Distribution
One of the rarest trees of eastern North America.  Found principally on the limestone cliffs of Kentucky, Tennessee and North Carolina, but it is hardy at the north to zone 4.

The largest specimen known is at Spring Grove Cemetery in Cincinnati, Ohio, 22 m tall and 2.2 m trunk diameter; the tallest known is a slender tree 27 m tall but only 0.55 m trunk diameter, at Plott Cove Research Natural Area, Georgia (Spongberg & Ma 1997; Eastern Native Trees Society).

Plants from Alabama have the leaves more densely hairy underneath than those from further north, and are distinguished as Cladrastis kentukea f. tomentosa (Steyermark) Spongberg.

Cultivation
Cladrastis kentukea is widely grown as an ornamental tree for its attractive flowers, and is locally naturalized in many areas of the eastern United States outside of its restricted native range. It thrives in full sunlight and in well-drained soil,  tolerates high pH soils as well as acid situations. The Yellowwood can withstand urban settings and is attractive to birds. A number of cultivars have been selected, including 'Perkin's Pink' (syn. 'Rosea', an invalid name) with pink flowers.

Kentucky yellowwood is recommended as one of the best medium-sized trees for cultivation as an ornamental plant in gardens.  The only quality that is mentioned is a tendency of the trunk to divide very near the ground, as a multi-trunked tree.

Uses
The name yellowwood derives from its yellow heartwood, used in small amounts for specialist furniture, gunstocks and decorative woodturning.

This plant has been marked as a pollinator plant, supporting and attracting bees and butterflies.

Distinctions

Yellowwood won a Pennsylvania Horticultural Society Gold Award in 1994.

The Society of Municipal Arborists selected the yellowwood (Cladrastis kentukea or C. lutea) as its Urban Tree of the Year for 2015.

References
Andrews, S. Trees of the Year: Cladrastis and Maakia. Int. Dendrol. Soc. Year Book 1996: 12–26.
Spongberg, S. A. & Ma, J.-S. (1997). Cladrastis (Leguminosae subfamily Faboideae tribe Sophoreae): a historic and taxonomic overview. Int. Dendrol. Soc. Year Book 1996: 27–35.

External links

Plants for a Future: Cladrastis lutea

Faboideae
Endemic flora of the United States
Flora of the Southeastern United States
Trees of the United States
Trees of the Southeastern United States
Trees of the Southern United States
Trees of the North-Central United States
Trees of the Northeastern United States
Garden plants of North America
Ornamental trees
Trees of the Great Lakes region (North America)
Plant dyes
Flora without expected TNC conservation status